

Track listing

Personnel
Scott Lucas – guitar, vocals, bass
Brian St. Clair – drums

References
 Amazon.com
 G&P Records
 iTunes Music Store

2013 EPs
Local H EPs
Self-released EPs